Makushinsky District is an administrative and municipal district (raion), one of the twenty-four in Kurgan Oblast, Russia. It is located in the east of the oblast. Its administrative center is the town of Makushino. Population:  23,978 (2002 Census);  The population of Makushino accounts for 46.0% of the district's total population.

References

Notes

Sources

Districts of Kurgan Oblast